Doea Tanda Mata (Mementos, literally "Two Eye Marks") is a 1985 Indonesian war film directed by Teguh Karya.

Plot
The film covers the limited nationalist resistance to Dutch colonial rule in the 1930s. A musician, played by Alex Komang, angered by the political murder of one of his friends, decides to murder a Dutch official. However, on falling in love with the sister (played by Jenny Rachman) of the murdered friend, he begins to wonder if vengeance is the right course.

Reception
Doea Tanda Mata was a great success at the box office in Indonesia, winning a number of Citra Awards (Indonesian Oscars).

References

Sources
 

1985 films
Indonesian war films
Indonesian National Awakening
1980s war films